is a Japanese animated television series. The episodes were directed by Nobuaki Nakanishi, and animated by the Japanese animation studio Studio Hibari. The series was based on the manga version of the same name, and followed the original story from the first two manga volumes closely for the first nine episodes, though with many differences. In episode ten, the anime starts to deviate from the manga and after that, the storyline in the anime has no connection with the manga. The main plot in the anime is the drama that relates from the three female main characters of Hazumu Osaragi, Yasuna Kamiizumi, and Tomari Kurusu, and their romantic struggles in a love triangle. Yasuna and Tomari vie for Hazumu's affections while Hazumu is initially unable to choose between them.

The televised series aired on the TV Tokyo Japanese television network between January 11, 2006, and March 29, 2006, comprising twelve main episodes. Four pieces of theme music were used in the anime, one opening theme, two ending themes, and one insert song used in episode twelve. The episodes were released on seven DVD compilations released between April 26, 2006, and October 27, 2006, each containing two episodes. The seventh DVD also contained an original video animation episode . The staff that produced the television series also produced the OVA. This episode is set four months after the events of the anime series during the Christmas season.

The episodes were licensed by Media Blasters in November 2006. The episodes were not dubbed into English, but still included subtitles in English. The first DVD went on sale on June 12, 2007, and contained the first five episodes. Extras on the disc included two ten-minute talks between the voice actresses for the three main female characters, a small collection of Japanese television advertisements, and textless opening videos. The second DVD went on sale on August 21, 2007, and the third and final DVD went on sale on October 23, 2007; the last two DVDs contain four episodes each, including the OVA episode. The first episode of the series was included with the June 2007 issue of Newtype USA. A re-release titled Kashimashi: Girl Meet Girl Vocal Collection was released on April 26, 2011, with an English dub.

Anime television series

OVA

References

External links
Official website 

Episodes
Kashimashi